Janez Jazbec, (born December 27, 1984 in Kranj), is a Slovenian alpine skier.

Jazbec represented Slovenia at the 2010 Winter Olympics.

References 

1984 births
Living people
Slovenian male alpine skiers
Alpine skiers at the 2010 Winter Olympics
Olympic alpine skiers of Slovenia
Sportspeople from Kranj